A multidenominational school is a relatively new type of primary school in Ireland. They often try to move away from traditional religion-based models, which are common in Ireland, typically these are Roman Catholic and, to a lesser extent, Church of Ireland schools.

Multidenominational schools claim to promote pluralism and multiculturalism in a way that traditional denominational schools have not.

See also
 Education in the Republic of Ireland
 Education in Northern Ireland
 Educate Together

External links
 Educate Together, the representative organisation for English-language multi-denominational schools in Ireland
 An Foras Pátrúnachta, founded in 1993 to act as an alternative patron for new gaelscoileanna (Irish language schools), its schools include Catholic schools, interdenominational schools, multi-denominational schools and non-denominational schools.
 Dalkey School Project, the first of the "Educate Together" schools
 Swords Educate Together National School, Educate Together School, in Swords County, Dublin

Schools in Ireland
School types